Winners of Odisha State Film Award for Best Singer:

References

Film music awards